Jules Moinaux, real name Joseph-Désiré Moineaux or Moineau (24 October 1815 – 4 December 1895) was a 19th-century French writer, playwright, and librettist. Georges Courteline, whose civil status name was Georges Moinaux (or Moineau), was his son.

Biography 
The son of Joseph-Jacques Moineau, a cabinetmaker in Tours, Jules Moinaux began with learning the trade from his father. But soon, he preferred to live by his pen, and became a journalist and a writer-reporter at Palais de Justice, Paris.

By the late 1840s, he began writing, very often in collaboration, comic pieces that found success. In 1853, he wrote Pépito, an opéra comique for Jacques Offenbach, and in 1855, again for Offenbach, Les Deux Aveugles, a musical buffoonery.

In 1866, his comedy Les Deux Sourds was created at the Théâtre des Variétés in Paris.

His judicial chronicles of the Criminal Court, written with verve for La Gazette des tribunaux, Le Charivari, etc., were collected in 1881 under the title Les Tribunaux comiques. His son Courteline sometimes drew inspiration from these for some of his own plays.

His satire of the police community, Le Bureau du Commissaire, was published in 1886 with a preface by Alexandre Dumas fils.

Le Monde ou l'on rit, his last work, was published in 1895. That collection of sketches featured among others Le Sourd qui n'avoue pas, On demande un malade gai, Le Rapia de Champigny, and L'Homme aux goûts champêtres.

He is buried at  located in the 12th arrondissement of Paris.

Works 

1846: La Cigale et la Fourmi
1849: La Conquête de la Chine, ode symphoni-charivarique
1850: Carrière politique d'un préfet de février, histoire de deux ans
1850: Une ordonnance de police, pot-pourri

1853: Pépito, opéra comique, music by Jacques Offenbach
1854: La Question d'Orient, à-propos-vaudeville mingled with couplets
1854: Dromadard et Panadier en Orient, à-propos-vaudeville
1855: Les Deux Aveugles, bouffonnerie musicale, music by Jacques Offenbach
1855: Les Gueux de Béranger, drama mingled with song
1857: La Botte secrète, folie-vaudeville
1858: Les Désespérés, one-act opéra comique
1858: L'Ut dièse, one-act bouffonnerie
1859: Le Zouave, récits et correspondances militaires
1859: La Clarinette mystérieuse, comédie en vaudeville
1861: Paris quand il pleut, comédie en vaudeville
1861: Le Voyage de M. Dunanan père et fils, opéra-bouffe
1861: Le Monsieur de la rue de Vendôme, one-act comédie en vaudeville
1862: Le Café de la rue de la Lune, one-act folie-vaudeville
1862: Le Secret du rétameur, one-act comédie en vaudeville
1862: Le Mari d'une étoile, two-act folie-vaudeville
1863: Les Géorgiennes, three-act opéra-bouffe, music by Jacques Offenbach read online, A. Lemerre
1864: Le Joueur de flûte, vaudeville romain, musique gauloise by Hervé
1864: Eh ! Lambert !, à-propos-vaudeville
1864: Les Marionnettes de l'amour, three-act comedy
1865: Les Campagnes de Boisfleury, one-act comédie en vaudeville
1866: Les Deux Sourds, comedy
1867: L'Homme à la mode... de Caen
1868: Les Abrutis du feuilleton, one-act bouffonnerie

1868: La Permission de minuit, tableau militaire
1869: La Foire d'Andouilli, tableau populaire
1869: L'Astronome du Pont-Neuf, one-act pochade musicale
1870: Le Ver rongeur, three-act play
1870: Le Joueur de flute, vaudeville romain
1870: Le Canard à trois becs, opéra-bouffe 
1871: Le Testament de Monsieur Crac, opéra-bouffe 
1874: Les Parisiennes, four-act opéra-bouffe 
1875: La Cruche cassée, opéra comique
1876: Le Jeu de l'amour et du... houzard, one-act comédie en vaudeville
1877: La Sorrentine, three-act opéra comique
1880: Les Mouchards, five-act play
1881: Les Tribunaux comiques, édition définitive
1881: Ça fait toujours plaisir
1886: Le Bureau du commissaire, foreword by Alexandre Dumas fils
1886: Un conseil judiciaire, three-act comedy
1886: Le Bracelet, one-act comedy
1888: Les Nouveaux Contes du Palais par la presse judiciaire parisienne
1888: Les Gaietés bourgeoises
1892: Le Monsieur au parapluie, novel
1894: Les Tribunaux du bon vieux temps, Causes grasses et causes salée
1895: Le Monde ou l'on rit

References

External links 
 Jules Moinaux on Wikisource
 Jules Moineaux on 
 Jules Moinaux écrivain humoriste 

French opera librettists
19th-century French dramatists and playwrights
1815 births
Writers from Tours, France
1895 deaths